August Hermann Berthold (August 19, 1831 – December 23, 1904) was a Prussian and German printer. He founded H. Berthold AG.

References

External links
 Hermann Berthold at MyFonts

1831 births
1904 deaths
German printers